A highsider or highside is a type of motorcycle accident characterized by sudden and violent rotation of the bike around its long axis. This generally happens when the rear wheel loses traction, skids, and then suddenly regains traction, creating a large torque which flips the rider head first off the side of the motorcycle or over the handlebars.

The initial traction loss may be caused by:

 New tires with wax or similar compounds on the sides of the wheel, or smooth tire on the edges giving low grip on first usage until the asphalt sands the rubber a little bit
 Locking the rear wheel through excessive braking
 Incorrect downshifting technique, producing excessive engine braking (even if the motorcycle has a slipper clutch)
 Applying too much throttle when exiting a corner
 Oversteering the bike into the turn by shifting weight to the front wheel and using balance to drift the rear wheel sideways
 Exceeding the lateral grip through too much speed (although, this is more likely to result in a lowsider), or too much lean
 An unexpected change in the surface friction (water, oil, dust, gravel, etc.)
 Reducing the friction on the rear tire by scraping the bodywork, footpegs or stand of the motorcycle on the road surface

Highsides differ from lowsides as follows: during a lowside the rear wheel slips laterally and continuously until the bike falls onto its side (the side that's inside the corner), while during a highside the rear wheel slips laterally only briefly before suddenly regaining traction and flipping the bike onto its other side (the side that's outside the corner, and therefore the higher side of the motorbike). As a result, highsides happen very quickly with little, if any, warning and are very violent.

If the wheels are not aligned in the direction of travel when traction is suddenly restored and the rear tire stops slipping, then a highside is likely, depending on how much the bike is turned across the direction of travel and how fast the bike is traveling when the rear tire stops slipping. If the angle is high enough, the bike is moving fast enough, and the rear tire slips and regains traction suddenly enough, the rider has no chance of preventing a highside.

Technical explanation 
Forces occurring between the motorcycle and the road (such as those that result in accelerating, decelerating and turning) occur at the contact patch through friction and normal forces. There is a limited amount of force tangential to the road that the contact patch can transmit before the tire begins to lose traction, and therefore slide or skid.

When going through a curve on a motorcycle, centripetal force (added to the other lateral forces such as acceleration or deceleration) is transferred from the road to the motorcycle through the contact patch, and is directed at a right angle to the path of travel. If the net force is greater than the static friction coefficient of the tire multiplied by the normal force of the motorcycle through the tire, the tire will skid outwards from the direction of the curve.

Once a tire slips in a curve, it will move outwards under the motorcycle. What happens from there depends on how well the rider is able to restore balance and control. If the tire regains traction after the rider starts to skid while the motorcycle is moving sideways, the tire will stop its sideways movement causing the motorcycle to suddenly jerk into an upright position (and beyond). This movement can easily cause the rider to be thrown off.

Injury risks

The term highside derives from the side of the motorcycle where the rider separates from it.  If forcibly thrown over the bike, the rider is said to have dismounted on the high side.

 The violent motion of the motorbike usually throws the rider several feet into the air which can result in broken bones on impact with the road surface.
 As the highside catches the rider unexpectedly, the rider's limbs can be thrown into protrusions on the bike (usually the handlebars) and suffer contusions.
 The rider is thrown ahead of the bike and is at risk of being hit and seriously injured by the bike, particularly if the rider stops quickly.

Because highsider accidents are so much more deadly than lowside accidents, the Motorcycle Safety Foundation recommends that if a rider locks the rear brake at higher speeds and the traction is good, the brake should not be released.

See also 
 Bicycle and motorcycle dynamics
 Lowsider
 Motorcycle safety

References 

Road accidents and incidents
Motorcycle dynamics